Michael James Davis (born July 21, 1947) is a senior United States district judge of the United States District Court for the District of Minnesota.

Early life, education, and career
Born in Cincinnati, Ohio, Davis grew up in Aurora, Illinois. He graduated from East Aurora High School in 1965. In high school, he was a star basketball player, wrote for the school newspaper, and served on student council. He received a Bachelor of Arts degree from Macalester College in 1969 and a Juris Doctor from the University of Minnesota Law School in 1972.

Davis served as a law clerk for the Legal Rights Center from 1971 to 1973. He was an attorney in the Office of Legal Counsel for the Social Security Administration in Baltimore, Maryland in 1973, and a criminal defense lawyer for the Neighborhood Justice Center in 1974. He returned to the Legal Rights Center as an attorney from 1975 to 1978. He then served as an attorney and commissioner at the Minneapolis Civil Rights Commission from 1977 to 1982 and as an attorney for the Hennepin County, Minnesota, Public Defender's Office from 1978 to 1983. Davis served as a judge in Hennepin County Municipal Court from 1983 to 1984 and a judge of the Fourth Judicial District of Minnesota (Hennepin County) from 1984 to 1994.

Federal judicial service
On November 19, 1993, President Bill Clinton nominated Davis to a seat on the United States District Court for the District of Minnesota vacated by Harry H. MacLaughlin. Confirmed by the Senate on March 25, 1994, Davis received his commission on March 28, 1994. In May 1999, Chief Justice William Rehnquist appointed Davis to serve as a judge on the Foreign Intelligence Surveillance Court. His term on this court expired on May 18, 2006. He served as Chief Judge of the District Court from 2008 to 2015. He assumed senior status on August 1, 2015.

Academic career
Davis has served as an adjunct professor at the University of Minnesota Law School from 1982 to 2013 and at William Mitchell College of Law from 1977 to 1981. He was also an instructor at the Minnesota Institute of Legal Education in 1991 and 1992.

See also 
 List of African-American federal judges
 List of African-American jurists
 List of first minority male lawyers and judges in Minnesota

References
  

1947 births
Living people
African-American judges
Judges of the United States District Court for the District of Minnesota
Macalester College alumni
Minnesota state court judges
Lawyers from Cincinnati
United States district court judges appointed by Bill Clinton
University of Minnesota Law School alumni
Judges of the United States Foreign Intelligence Surveillance Court
20th-century American judges
21st-century American judges
Public defenders